The Litani or Itany is a river which forms part of the boundary between Suriname and French Guiana. It is a tributary, or the upper course, of the Maroni. The boundary is disputed, with Suriname also claiming land to the east of the river.

The Litani river flows in the Lawa near Antecume Pata, and is fed from the Loë en Ulemari creeks. The river was first explored in 1950 by A. Franssen Herderschee into the Tumuk Humak Mountains.

See also
Borders of Suriname

Notes

References
 

Rivers of French Guiana
Rivers of Suriname
Rivers of France
French Guiana–Suriname border
International rivers of South America
Border rivers